Sally Bomer is an American dancer and choreographer. Recently, she's been working in a different medium, according to her website, mark making and drawing.

References

Living people
American choreographers
Year of birth missing (living people)